A unified team of South Korea and North Korea competed under the title "Korea" at the 2018 Winter Olympics in ice hockey.

At the 2018 Winter Olympics, the delegations from both the host nation South Korea and North Korea marched together in the opening ceremony under the Korean Unification Flag.

Background
In January 2018, it was announced that the South Korea women's national ice hockey team would be amalgamated with a group of North Korean players to form a single Korea women's national ice hockey team in the tournament. They competed under the country code "COR", from the abbreviation of French word . (The country code "KOR" is already used for South Korea; the IOC uses "PRK" for North Korea.) The anthem which played when the Korea team played in international ice hockey is the folk song "Arirang" instead of the national anthems of either South Korea or North Korea. The team's uniform featured the silhouette of the Korean peninsula with the text "Korea". Because of ongoing U.S. sanctions against North Korea, the uniforms were made by a Finnish company instead of official sponsor Nike.

The first match of the unified Korean women's ice hockey team was attended by various dignitaries, including International Olympic Committee President Thomas Bach, South Korean President Moon Jae-in, North Korean President of the Presidium of the Supreme People's Assembly Kim Yong-nam and North Korean Director of the Propaganda and Agitation Department of the Workers' Party of Korea Kim Yo-jong.

Competitors 
The following is the list of number of competitors who participated in the unified Korean team.

Ice hockey 

Summary

Women's tournament

South Korea qualified as the host. From a roster of 35 players, at minimum of three North Korean players were selected for each game.

Team roster
Women's team event – 1 team of 35 players

Preliminary round

5–8th place semifinal

Seventh place game

See also
 Korea Team
 North Korea at the 2018 Winter Olympics
 South Korea at the 2018 Winter Olympics

References

External links
 
 
 
Korea at the 2018 Winter Olympics

Korea Unified
Winter Olympics (Korea)
Winter Olympics (Korea)
Women's sport in Korea
North Korea–South Korea relations
North Korea at the Winter Olympics by year
South Korea at the Winter Olympics by year
2018